Sheet (or "The Sheet") is a small modern village in the parish of Ludford about  from the town centre of Ludlow, Shropshire.

It was mentioned in the Domesday Book of 1086. It was part of the Saxon hundred of Culvestan, which ended in the reign of Henry I, and thereafter Sheet belonged to Munslow hundred.

The A49 road (the Ludlow by-pass) runs through the area, with a roundabout junction for Sheet Road, an unclassified road which begins at the junction of Lower Galdeford and Weeping Cross Lane in Ludlow, runs through Sheet, and heads out to the village of Caynham.

Ludlow's only park and ride (using buses to the town centre) car park site is at Sheet.

The Ledwyche Brook flows just to the east.

Foldgate
Foldgate lies within the Ludlow by-pass but remains within the parish of Ludford, situated between Sheet and the River Teme. There is a new pub run by Marston's — the Squirrel — as well as a Travelodge and a small supermarket and petrol/diesel filling station.

References

External links

Ludford Parish Plan (2004) pages 18 & 19

Villages in Shropshire
Ludlow